The Final Countdown Tour 1986 is a concert video released by the Swedish hard rock band Europe. It features footage from a concert filmed at Solnahallen in  Solna, Sweden on May 26, 1986. It was first released on VHS in Japan in 1986, and was released on DVD and CD in 2004.

A remastered edition, entitled The Final Countdown Tour 1986: Live in Sweden - 20th Anniversary Edition, was released on DVD on October 4, 2006 to mark the 20th anniversary of the album The Final Countdown.

Track listing
 "The Final Countdown" 
 "Ninja" 
 "Carrie" 
 "On the Loose" 
 "Cherokee" 
 "Time Has Come"
 "Open Your Heart"
 "Stormwind" 
 "Rock the Night"

Personnel
Joey Tempest – lead vocals, acoustic guitars
John Norum – lead & rhythm guitars, backing vocals
John Levén – bass guitar
Mic Michaeli – keyboards, backing vocals
Ian Haugland – drums, backing vocals

Europe (band) video albums
1986 live albums
Live video albums
1986 video albums